Go was a rock supergroup formed in 1976 by Stomu Yamashta (percussion and keyboards), which included Steve Winwood (vocals and keyboards), Al Di Meola (lead guitar), Klaus Schulze (synthesizers) and Michael Shrieve (drums). Go is the Japanese word for "five".

Go recorded two studio albums, Go (1976) and Go Too (1977). The band also recorded the 12 June 1976 concert they performed in France, which was released as the album Go: Live from Paris (1976).

Discography

References

External links
 Stomu Yamashta’s Go at musicaficionado.blog

American progressive rock groups
Musical groups established in 1976
Musical groups disestablished in 1978
1976 establishments in the United States
1978 disestablishments in the United States